Dreams to Remember: The Otis Redding Anthology is a 1998 compilation album by American soul singer-songwriter Otis Redding. Advertised as a stopgap between the greatest hits album Very Best Of and the boxset Otis! The Definitive Otis Redding, this two-disc album offers most of Redding's greatest hits, a few album tracks and 5 live recordings taken from The Monterey International Pop Festival.

Reception
In his review for Allmusic, Stephen Thomas Erlewine states that while the music on the album is superb, it tries to be both a best of and a box set and so fails at both.

Commercial performance
The album sold in excess of 40,000 copies and was voted 147th on the 500 greatest albums of all time by Rolling Stone.

Track listing

Personnel
Otis Redding – vocals, guitar
Carla Thomas – vocals
Booker T. Jones – guitar, piano, electronic organ
Steve Cropper – guitar, piano, bass
Johnny Jenkins – guitar
Charles "Packy" Axton – tenor saxophone
Andrew Love – tenor saxophone
Joe Arnold – tenor saxophone
Gilbert Caples – tenor saxophone
Gene Parker – tenor saxophone
Tommie Lee Williams – tenor saxophone
Floyd Newman – baritone saxophone
Wayne Jackson – trumpet
Sammie Coleman – trumpet
Gene "Bowlegs" Miller – trumpet
Ben Cauley – trumpet
Isaac Hayes – piano, organ
Lewis Steinberg – bass
Donald "Duck" Dunn – bass
Wayne Cochran – bass
Al Jackson Jr. – drums
Rick Hall – drums
Phil Walden – tambourine
William Bell
David Porter – background vocals
The Pinetoppers

References

1998 compilation albums
Otis Redding albums
Compilation albums published posthumously
Rhythm and blues compilation albums
Rhino Records compilation albums